Free Lives (Pty) Ltd is an independent South African video game developer based in Cape Town. Founded in April 2012 and led by creative director Evan Greenwood, Free Lives is best known for creating the video game Broforce and has also developed the comedy game Genital Jousting and the virtual reality game Gorn. Free Lives is primarily published through the American publisher Devolver Digital.

History

Background 
Free Lives was founded in April 2012 by video game programmer and creative director Evan Greenwood and is based on a property that is part studio, part house in Cape Town, South Africa. The titles developed by Free Lives do not sell well on the African continent and the studio's audience lies predominantly in the United States, as well as Europe, South America, and China. Free Lives staff have showcased their products at various North American and European game conventions, and was part of the Sony press conference at E3 2017. As of 2017, some of the Free Lives staff lives on-site, making use of a communal kitchen.

Video games 
Free Lives first got involved with the video game industry when the team entered Rambros, a pixel art 2D shooter game inspired by 1980s and 1990s action movies, in the April 2012 Ludum Dare game jam. Rambros was awarded for its graphics and humor at Ludum Dare, and Free Lives continued to expand and tweak the game in the following years. Rambros was soon renamed to Broforce and was made freely available on the Free Lives website the next year. Broforce was first officially released through Steam Greenlight in 2013, and received a spin-off titled The Expendabros in 2014. After one of the Free Lives team members met publisher Devolver Digital at the A Maze indie festival in Berlin, Devolver Digital signed the studio on and Broforce was published in 2015.

Late 2016, Free Lives made the comedy game Genital Jousting available through the Steam Early Access program. In this multiplayer party game, players attempt to move flaccid, disembodied penises into disembodied anuses. Though Genital Jousting has been described as "extraordinarily juvenile", it was designed in part to deliver a sex-positive message to an audience that might not come to hear it otherwise. The studio stated in its developer blog that heterosexual men are socialized not to discuss how they feel about anal sex or penises touching each other, and wrote: "we were highly motivated by the fact that Genital Jousting gave us a vehicle to have those discussions amongst ourselves." Greenwood told The Sunday Times that "at heart, the game is a play on masculinity, an attempt to disrupt entrenched notions of male power and authority." The game would not be allowed on major console platforms such as Xbox or PlayStation. When Genital Jousting was banned from livestreaming service Twitch, Nigel Lowrie of Devolver Digital contacted Steam to see if the game could be livestreamed through the platform's internal broadcasting system. Genital Jousting became the first game to be broadcast through Steam's live streaming feature.

On 10 July 2017, Free Lives released the virtual reality game Gorn for the Oculus Rift and HTC Vive on Steam Early Access. Described as a "ludicrously violent VR gladiator simulator," Gorn features a physics-driven combat engine and a large amount of violent gore. Free Lives stated that they used the Early Access service in order to be able to expand the game with features players want to see.

Success 
The entire Free Lives team moved to Tamarin on the island nation of Mauritius for three months in late 2016, using the profit from their success with Broforce. Free Lives produced a video series here titled Game Jam Island, in which they documented their experience developing a video game on the popular vacation island.

In January 2019, Genital Jousting became a finalist for the 2019 Independent Games Festival, under the Excellence in Narrative category.

Games developed

References

External links 
 

2012 establishments in South Africa
Companies based in Cape Town
Indie video game developers
Video game companies established in 2012
Video game companies of South Africa
Video game development companies